The third series of The Great British Bake Off began airing on Tuesday 14 August 2012. The series was filmed at Harptree Court in East Harptree, Somerset.

Seven thousand applied for the competition and twelve contestants were chosen. The competition was won by John Whaite.

The third series was broadcast as the fifth season on PBS in the United States.

Bakers

Results summary 

 There was no elimination the sixth week after John sustained a major injury to his finger and could not complete the last bake. The judges determined it would be unfair to eliminate anyone and instead, two bakers were eliminated the next week. 

Colour key:

Episodes

Episode 1: Cakes 
The contestants were required to make an upside-down cake for their signature bake. The bakers were given two hours to make a sponge topped with fruits of their choice. For the technical bake, Paul set the bakers the challenge of making four rum babas with cream in the middle and sliced fruits on top, to be completed in three hours. For the showstopper, the bakers were given the task of making a cake in five hours, and the cake baked should reveal a hidden design when cut.

  

 Unseen in the episode

Episode 2: Bread 
For the signature bake, the bakers were required to make twelve flatbreads; six with yeast, six without. They were given two and a half hours to complete the task. For the technical challenge, they had to make an eight-strand plaited loaf in two hours using a recipe from Paul. For the showstopper bake, the bakers were given four hours to make twenty-four bagels: twelve sweet, and twelve savoury.

Episode 3: Tarts 
The classic tarte tatin was set as the signature challenge. The tarte tatin could be sweet or savoury, and had to be finished in two and half hours. Baking a treacle tart was set as the technical challenge by Mary, with the requirement that the pastry lattice on top be woven. The bakers were given two hours for the challenge. For the showstopper, the bakers were required to make a large designer fruit tart, fit for a window display, in less than three hours.

Episode 4: Desserts 
The bakers were given three hours to make a torte without conventional wheat flour as the signature bake. The torte had to be more than 20 cm in diameter. Mary set crème caramel as the technical challenge, to be finished in two and three-quarter hours. A four-layered meringue dessert was the showstopper challenge.

Episode 5: Pies 
The signature bake was Wellington, which Paul specified should be at least eight inches long and completely covered with pastry. The bakers were given three hours for the challenge. The technical challenge was to make a hand-raised pie in two and a quarter hours. This was to be made with a hot water crust and moulded using a dolly. The pie was left to set overnight and judged the next day. For the showstopper challenge, the bakers were required to bake a family-sized sweet American-style pie in three and a half hours.

Episode 6: Puddings 
The bakers were challenged to make, in two hours, two different flavoured sponge puddings with different accompaniments, six of each. Mary set the Queen of Puddings as the technical challenge. For the showstopper, the bakers were required to make in three and a half hours one large strudel, either with sweet or savoury fillings.

John sustained a deep wound on his finger on the blade of the food processor and had to leave the tent to receive medical attention.  He was unable to complete his Showstopper Challenge. As a result, the judges decided it would be unfair to eliminate a baker this week.

Episode 7: Sweet Dough 
For the signature bake, the bakers were set to bake 24 buns made from an enriched dough with yeast in three hours. The buns should be all of the same size and evenly baked. For the technical bake, the bakers were challenged to make ten jam doughnuts, using Paul's recipe, in two and a half hours. They should be consistent in size, shape, jam distribution, and colour. For the showstopper, the bakers each made a celebratory enriched-dough loaf. This challenge started straight after the technical bake, so that the dough could be proofed overnight if necessary.

Two bakers were eliminated this week as there was no elimination the previous week following John's injury.

Episode 8: Biscuits 
The bakers were given two hours to make 48 crackers or crisp breads for their signature bake. They should be thin, evenly baked and crack when snapped in two. For the technical challenge, the bakers were asked to make six chocolate teacakes in two hours using Paul's recipe, a task made more difficult because the high temperature that day would not allow the chocolate to cool. For the showstopper bake, the bakers were challenged to make a gingerbread structure, which should not be a gingerbread house, in four hours.

Episode 9: Pâtisserie (Semi-final) 
For the first pâtisserie test, the bakers were required to make three types of petits fours, 12 of each. These should be small (each a single mouthful), exquisite and perfect. Mary set the bakers to make a Fraisier cake for the technical challenge. Choux pastry gateau was set as the showstopper.

Episode 10: Final 
The finalists were set the task of making a savoury pithivier in two and a half hours. Paul and Mary's technical challenge required 25 fondant fancies. For the final showstopper, the finalists were required to make in four hours a chiffon cake based on the theme of their personal highlights of 2012. All the bakes were served at a special summer fête held on the ground of Harptree Court.

Extras and special episodes
Four additional episodes were broadcast after the final. Episode 11 was a masterclass by Paul and Mary where they demonstrated how to make the technical challenges they set – treacle tarts, rum babas, creme caramels, the hand-raised pie, and the eight-strand plaited loaf. Episode 12 revisited the bakers from series two to catch up on what these contestants had been doing after the show ended. Another masterclass was shown in episode 13 where Paul and Mary showed how to make Queen of Puddings, jam doughnuts, tempered chocolate teacakes, Fraisier cakes and fondant fancies. In episode 14, Paul and Mary showed which signature bakes they would have chosen if they were in the bakers' shoes (including sponge puddings, flat breads and sweet buns). Two further episodes of Masterclass were shown, one before Christmas and another before Easter.

Post-show career

John Whaite gained a first-class degree from the University of Manchester after sitting his law exams while filming Bake Off, but he rejected a career in law and opted to take classes at Le Cordon Bleu and pursue a career in baking. His book John Whaite Bakes: Recipes for Every Day and Every Mood was published on 25 April 2013. His second book, John Whaite Bakes at Home, was published on 27 March 2014. He first set up a chocolate shop The Hungry Dog Artisan Chocolates, and opened a cookery school on his family's dairy farm in Lancashire. He also appeared as a resident chef on the ITV show Lorraine, and wrote a column on food for The Daily Telegraph. In 2016, Whaite presented with Rosemary Shrager a daytime cookery competitive show Chopping Block on ITV. In 2018, after six years of directing his attention on writing cookbooks, leading baking classes, and making television appearances, Whaite decided to refocus on law.

James Morton aimed for a career in medicine but has written a book on bread, titled Brilliant Bread, published on 29 August 2013. He writes a baking column for the Scottish newspaper Sunday Mail. His second book, How Baking Works: ...And what to do if it doesn't, was published on 12 March 2015.

Brendan Lynch is teaching cookery classes.

Cathryn Dresser and Sarah-Jane Willis teamed up to open a stall at Horsham Market. Dresser wrote a baking book for children and parents titled Let's Bake, published on 22 May 2014. and ran The Little Handcross Bakery in Handcross, West Sussex between September 2014 and May 2015.

Ratings
The final of this series had a record overnight figure of 6.5 million viewers, beating every other programme in other channels in its time slot.

Official episode viewing figures are from BARB.

Specials

References

External links
 
 "Bake Off star in a stew over Shetland book" (11 October 2018) by Elizabeth Burden at The Times
 Series Six application form

Series 3
2012 British television seasons